The Great Brain Robbery is a board game designed by James Ernest and released in 2000 by Cheapass Games.

Gameplay
It is a wild west-themed sequel to Give Me the Brain, and the fourth in the Friedey's series of games.  Players assume the role of zombies attempting to rob a speeding train full of brains.
The game is played on a board made up of train carriages, printed on eight double-sided boards.  As the players move forward through the carriages, new ones are added and old ones fall off, giving a varied and changing game board. The Great Brain Robbery was the first board game to come in a sturdy cardboard box. It includes 25 brain cards.

Reception
In 2001, The Great Brain Robbery won the Origins Award for Best Science Fiction or Fantasy Board Game 2000.

References

External links
The Great Brain Robbery product page at Cheapass Games

Board games introduced in 2000
Cheapass Games games
Board games with a modular board
Horror board games
Origins Award winners